Yashino may refer to:
Yashino, Ivanovo Oblast, a village in Ivanovo Oblast, Russia
Yashino, Leningrad Oblast, a settlement in Leningrad Oblast, Russia
Yashino, name of several other rural localities in Russia